Gangaghat is a city and a municipal board in Unnao district  in the state of Uttar Pradesh, India. It's Just 12 km from Unnao, 10 km from Kanpur.

Demographics
 India census, Gangaghat had a population of 84,072. Males constitute 53% of the population and females 47%. Gangaghat has an average literacy rate of 66%, higher than the national average of 59.5%: male literacy is 71%, and female literacy is 60%. In Gangaghat, 14% of the population is under 6 years of age.

References

Cities and towns in Unnao district